Wheelchair basketball at the 1980 Summer Paralympics consisted of men's and women's team events.

Medal summary 

Source: Paralympic.org

See also
Basketball at the 1980 Summer Olympics

References 

 

Wheelchair basketball
1980
1980 in basketball
International basketball competitions hosted by the Netherlands